"A Banda (Ah Bahn-da)" (Portuguese for "The Band") is a composition by Chico Buarque that was first performed live in 1966 by Buarque and Nara Leão, during the II Música Popular Brasileira (MPB) Festival in TV Record's theater, São Paulo, winning the "Viola de Ouro" award for best composition. "A Banda" brought Buarque immediately into the limelight in Brazil. The song was also released in 1966, on the Brazilian RGE label, as the first track of side 1 in Chico Buarque de Hollanda (Vol. 1) LP. The following year Astrud Gilberto brought the song to the US, recording it with English lyrics on the Verve/Copacabana label, crediting Bob Russell for the English lyrics.  As an instrumental, the song was performed by Herb Alpert & the Tijuana Brass, who had their third and final number one on the Easy Listening chart in October 1967. It peaked at number 35 on the Billboard Hot 100. The French singer France Gall popularized this song, titled "Zwei Apfelsinen im Haar" in German ("Two oranges in the hair" in English). A Czech version named "La banda" was performed by Vladěna Krumlová in 1969. 

The instrumental version by Herb Alpert & the Tijuana Brass was used in the Soviet cartoon Well, Just You Wait! in the 8th episode (at 06:27-07:30).

Also in 1999 the German band Captain Jack used a riff from "A Banda" in the song "Get Up".

See also
List of number-one adult contemporary singles of 1967 (U.S.)

References

Chico Buarque songs
1967 singles
Herb Alpert songs
1960s instrumentals
1966 songs
A&M Records singles
Songs about musicians